The 2011 Youngstown State Penguins football team represented Youngstown State University in the 2011 NCAA Division I FCS football season. The Penguins were led by second-year head coach Eric Wolford and played their home games at Stambaugh Stadium. They are a member of the Missouri Valley Football Conference. They finished the season 6–5, 4–4 in MVFC play to finish in a tie for fourth place.

Schedule

References

Youngstown State
Youngstown State Penguins football seasons
Youngstown State Penguins football